Henderson North is a suburb of West Auckland, New Zealand.

Demographics

Henderson North had a population of 3,771 at the 2018 New Zealand census, an increase of 369 people (10.8%) since the 2013 census, and an increase of 711 people (23.2%) since the 2006 census. There were 1,173 households, comprising 1,833 males and 1,941 females, giving a sex ratio of 0.94 males per female. The median age was 34.9 years (compared with 37.4 years nationally), with 732 people (19.4%) aged under 15 years, 834 (22.1%) aged 15 to 29, 1,758 (46.6%) aged 30 to 64, and 447 (11.9%) aged 65 or older.

Ethnicities were 43.2% European/Pākehā, 14.1% Māori, 19.4% Pacific peoples, 34.6% Asian, and 4.1% other ethnicities. People may identify with more than one ethnicity.

The percentage of people born overseas was 44.6, compared with 27.1% nationally.

Although some people chose not to answer the census's question about religious affiliation, 39.1% had no religion, 44.0% were Christian, 1.0% had Māori religious beliefs, 4.0% were Hindu, 2.1% were Muslim, 1.8% were Buddhist and 2.0% had other religions.

Of those at least 15 years old, 678 (22.3%) people had a bachelor's or higher degree, and 525 (17.3%) people had no formal qualifications. The median income was $27,300, compared with $31,800 nationally. 321 people (10.6%) earned over $70,000 compared to 17.2% nationally. The employment status of those at least 15 was that 1,461 (48.1%) people were employed full-time, 381 (12.5%) were part-time, and 159 (5.2%) were unemployed.

Education
Waitakere College is a coeducational secondary (years 9-13) school with a roll of  students. It opened about 1974.

Henderson Intermediate is a coeducational intermediate (years 7-8) school with a roll of  students. It opened in 1964.

Liston College and St Dominic's College are secondary (years 7-13) Catholic schools for boys and girls, respectively.

Henderson North School is a coeducational contributing primary (years 1-6) school with a roll of  students. It celebrated its 50th jubilee in 2007.

Notes

External links
 Waitakere College website
 Henderson North School website

Suburbs of Auckland
Henderson-Massey Local Board Area
West Auckland, New Zealand